Poon Hill (पून हिल) is a hill station overlooking the Annapurna Massif range and Dhaulagiri mountain range, located on border of Myagdi District and Kaski District in Gandaki Province of Nepal. This lookout is the key viewpoint in the Ghorepani Poon Hill trek. Mountains such as an Annapurna 8,091m, Dhaulagiri 8,127, Annapurna South 7,219 Meter, Machapuchare 6,993 Meter, Hinchuli, Annapurna III, Dhampus peak, Dhulagiri II, and many other tall peaks can be seen from here.

Poon Hill is located 270 km west from Kathmandu (The capital of Nepal). The hike to Poon Hill from Pokhara takes 2–3 days. The Poon Hill viewpoint is on the way to Annapurna Sanctuary which lies in the centre of Annapurna Conservation Area. Trekkers need to obtain an ACCAP Permit from Kathmandu or Pokhara in order to complete this hike.

List of mountains seen from Poon Hill
Some of the peaks which are visible from the top of Poon Hill are listed below.

Gallery

References

External links

Populated places in Myagdi District
Hills of Nepal